The 1891 Iowa College Pioneers football team was an American football team that represented Iowa College (later renamed Grinnell College) during the 1891 college football season. In its first season under head coach Theron Lyman, the team compiled a 1–1–1 record.

Schedule

References

Iowa College
Grinnell Pioneers football seasons
Iowa College Pioneers football